Carl H. June (born 1953) is an American immunologist and oncologist. He is currently the Richard W. Vague Professor in Immunotherapy in the Department of Pathology and Laboratory Medicine at the Perelman School of Medicine of the University of Pennsylvania. He is most well known for his research into T cell therapies for the treatment of cancer.
In 2020 he was elected to the American Philosophical Society.

Education and career 
June graduated from the US Naval Academy in 1975 and earned his medical degree in from the Baylor College of Medicine in 1979. He spent his fourth year of medical school at the World Health Organization in Geneva, Switzerland, studying immunology and malaria with Dr. Paul Henri-Lambert, and completed clinical training in internal medicine and medical oncology from 1979 to 1983 at the National Naval Medical Center in Bethesda, Maryland. June conducted postdoctoral research in transplantation biology with E. Donnall Thomas and John Hansen at the Fred Hutchinson Cancer Center in Seattle from 1983 to 1986. After completing his training, he returned to Bethesda, where he founded the Immune Cell Biology Program at the Naval Medical Research Center and was head of the department of immunology from 1990 to 1995. He was also a professor of medicine and of cell and molecular biology at the Uniformed Services University for the Health Sciences. In 1999 June joined the University of Pennsylvania as a professor of molecular and cellular engineering at the University of Pennsylvania's school of medicine and investigator at the Abramson Family Cancer Research Institute, where he remains today. He is board-certified in internal medicine and oncology.

Research 
June has been a pioneer in the field of immunotherapy, most widely known for the development of T-cell therapy for cancer. In the 1980s, his lab supported research for the CD28 molecule as the major control switch for T cells. A few years later, tested the ability to culture genetically modified CAR-Ts in humans, discovering the cells could engraft and persist in patients with HIV/AIDS for years. His work led to the development and commercialization of tisagenlecleucel, the first FDA-approved gene therapy.

Awards and honors 
 1978 - Alpha Omega Alpha Medical Society.
 1978 - Michael E. DeBakey Scholar award for the Outstanding Medical Student, Baylor College of Medicine
 1991 - Fellow, American College of Physicians.
 1996 - Legion of Merit, US Navy
 1996 - Dexter Conrad Award, Office of Naval Research, Navy’s highest award for Scientific Achievement
 1997 - Frank Brown Berry Prize in Federal Medicine
 2001 - Burroughs Wellcome Fund Award: visiting professor in the basic medical sciences
 2002 - Lifetime Achievement Award, Leukemia and Lymphoma Society
 2002 - William Osler Award, University of Pennsylvania School of Medicine
 2005-09 - Bristol-Myers Squibb Freedom to Discover Award
 2005 - Federal Laboratory Award for Excellence in Technology Transfer.
 2012 - William B. Coley Award for Distinguished Research in Basic and Tumor Immunology
 2012 - Earnest Beutler Lecture and Prize, American Society of Hematology
 2012 - Elected to Institute of Medicine
 2013 - The Philadelphia Award
 2013 - Richard V Smalley Award, Society for Immunotherapy of Cancer
 2014 - Elected to American Academy of Arts and Sciences.
 2014 - Taubman Prize for Excellence in Translational Medical Science.
 2014 - Steinman Award for Human Immunology Research, American Association of Immunologists
 2014 - Aubrey Evans Award / Ronald McDonald House
 2014 - Karl Landsteiner Memorial Award, AABB.
 2014 - Taubman Prize for Excellence in Translational Medical Science
 2014 - Hamdan Award for Medical Research Excellence
 2015 - Paul Ehrlich and Ludwig Darmstaedter Prize.
 2015 - Watanabe Prize for Translational Research, Indianna University and Eli Lilly
 2015 - Lifetime Achievement Award Lecture, Miami Winter Symposium
 2015 - Debrecen Award for Molecular Medicine, University of Debrecen
 2015 - AACR-CRI Lloyd J. Old Award in Cancer Immunology.
 2015 - Award for Distinguished Research in the Biomedical Sciences, Association of American Medical Colleges
 2015 - Paul Ehrlich and Ludwig Darmstaedter Prize
 2015 - E. Donnall Thomas Award Lecture, American Society for Blood and Marrow Transplantation
 2016 - John Scott Medal
 2016 - Distinguished Graduate Award, U.S. Naval Academy.
 2016 - Novartis Prize in Immunology
 2016 - Clinical Research Achievement Award.
 2017 - Karnofsky Prize, ASCO
 2017 - Distinguished Scientist Award, Association of American Cancer Institutes
 2018 - Time 100: The Most Influential People of 2018
 2018 - Albany Medical Center Prize in Medicine and Biomedical Research.
 2018 - Passano Prize
 2019 - ACTS Distinguished Investigator: Translation from Proof-of-Concept to Applicability for Widespread Clinical Practice Award
 2019 - Harrington Prize, American Society for Clinical Investigation
 2019 - The Edward Netter Leadership Award, Alliance for Cancer Gene Therapy 
 2020 - Lorraine Cross Award
 2020 - Elected member American Philosophical Society
 2020 - Genome Valley Excellence Award, BioAsia
 2020 - Elected member National Academy of Sciences
 2020 - Sanford Lorraine Cross Award
 2021 - Dan David Prize
 2021 - Outstanding Achievement Award, American Society of Gene & Cell Therapy
 2022 - The Keio Medical Science Prize
 2022 - Maria I. New International Prize for Biomedical Research
 2023 - Phacilitate Lifetime Achievement Award

References

External links 
 
 
 Carl June Lab at University of Pennsylvania 

Living people
United States Naval Academy alumni
United States Navy officers
Fellows of the American Academy of Arts and Sciences
Baylor College of Medicine alumni
American immunologists
1953 births
Members of the American Philosophical Society
Fred Hutchinson Cancer Research Center people